This Week in WWE is an American television program produced by WWE which mainly recaps events taking place on Raw and SmackDown. The show premiered on February 9, 2009.

The program is similar to WWE Experience, initially with the difference of This Week in WWE running only 30 minutes. It expanded to 60 minutes beginning with the September 22, 2022 episode.

Hosts

See also

List of current WWE programming

References

Television series by WWE
2009 American television series debuts
2010s American television series
USA Network original programming
WWE Raw
WWE SmackDown
2020s American television series